Onychomyrmex doddi is a species of ant in the genus Onychomyrmex, endemic to Australia. It was first described by William Morton Wheeler in 1916. Workers are small, being only 2-2.5 mm in length.

References

External links

Amblyoponinae
Hymenoptera of Australia
Insects of Australia
Insects described in 1916